Sauid Drepaul (born 14 April 1985) is a Surinamese cricketer. He played in the 2015 ICC World Cricket League Division Six tournament.

References

External links
 

1985 births
Living people
Sportspeople from Georgetown, Guyana
Surinamese cricketers